Bodensee is an electoral constituency (German: Wahlkreis) represented in the Bundestag. It elects one member via first-past-the-post voting. Under the current constituency numbering system, it is designated as constituency 293. It is located in southeastern Baden-Württemberg, comprising the Bodenseekreis district and southern parts of the Sigmaringen district.

Bodensee was created for the 2009 federal election. Since 2021, it has been represented by Volker Mayer-Lay of the Christian Democratic Union (CDU).

Geography
Bodensee is located in southeastern Baden-Württemberg. As of the 2021 federal election, it comprises the district of Bodensee and the municipalities of Herdwangen-Schönach, Illmensee, Pfullendorf, and Wald from the Sigmaringen district.

History
Bodensee was created in 2009 and contained parts of the abolished constituency of Ravensburg – Bodensee and the redistributed constituency of Zollernalb – Sigmaringen. Its constituency number and borders have not changed since its creation.

Members
The constituency was first represented by Lothar Riebsamen of the Christian Democratic Union (CDU) from 2009 to 2021. He was succeeded by Volker Mayer-Lay in 2021.

Election results

2021 election

2017 election

2013 election

2009 election

References

Federal electoral districts in Baden-Württemberg
2009 establishments in Germany
Constituencies established in 2009
Bodenseekreis
Sigmaringen (district)